Fernando Morales may refer to:

 Fernando Morales (footballer born 1985), Mexican footballer
 Fernando Morales (footballer born 1986), Paraguayan footballer
 Fernando Morales (volleyball) (born 1982), volleyball player from Puerto Rico